Schedius (Ancient Greek: Σχεδίος Skhedíos means 'near') was a name attributed to four individuals in Greek mythology.

Schedius, son of Iphitus by Hippolyte or Thrasybule and brother of Epistrophus. He was counted among the suitors of Helen. In the Iliad, he and his brother lead the Phocians on the side of the Achaeans in the Trojan War, Schedius being commander of ten ships out of forty brought by both brothers. He was killed when Hector threw a spear at Ajax, who dodged it. Both brothers' bones, were carried back and buried at Anticyra. Their tomb existed until the Roman times. Pausanias also cites that Schedius's icon was displayed at Delphi.
Schedius, son of Perimedes, was a leader of the Phocians. He was killed by Hector.
Schedius, a defender of Troy who was killed by Neoptolemus.
Schedius, one of the Suitors of Penelope who came from Dulichium along with other 56 wooers. He, with the other suitors, was shot dead by Odysseus with the assistance of Eumaeus, Philoetius, and Telemachus.

Notes

References 

 Apollodorus, The Library with an English Translation by Sir James George Frazer, F.B.A., F.R.S. in 2 Volumes, Cambridge, MA, Harvard University Press; London, William Heinemann Ltd. 1921. . Online version at the Perseus Digital Library. Greek text available from the same website.
Homer, The Iliad with an English Translation by A.T. Murray, Ph.D. in two volumes. Cambridge, MA., Harvard University Press; London, William Heinemann, Ltd. 1924. . Online version at the Perseus Digital Library.
Homer, Homeri Opera in five volumes. Oxford, Oxford University Press. 1920. . Greek text available at the Perseus Digital Library.
 Quintus Smyrnaeus, The Fall of Troy translated by Way. A. S. Loeb Classical Library Volume 19. London: William Heinemann, 1913. Online version at theio.com
 Quintus Smyrnaeus, The Fall of Troy. Arthur S. Way. London: William Heinemann; New York: G.P. Putnam's Sons. 1913. Greek text available at the Perseus Digital Library.
Tzetzes, John, Allegories of the Iliad translated by Goldwyn, Adam J. and Kokkini, Dimitra. Dumbarton Oaks Medieval Library, Harvard University Press, 2015. 

Achaean Leaders
Trojans

People of the Trojan War
Suitors of Penelope